Polany may refer to:

Polány, Hungary
Polany, Lesser Poland Voivodeship (south Poland)
Polany, Lublin Voivodeship (east Poland)
Polany, Subcarpathian Voivodeship (south-east Poland)
Polany, Masovian Voivodeship (east-central Poland)
Polany, Warmian-Masurian Voivodeship (north Poland)

See also
Poľany
Polányi